Drăgoești is a commune located in Ialomița County, Muntenia, Romania. It is composed of five villages: Chiroiu-Pământeni, Chiroiu-Satu Nou, Chiroiu-Ungureni, Drăgoești and Valea Bisericii.

References

Communes in Ialomița County
Localities in Muntenia